James Renwick Wylie (1861–1951) was an American professional baseball player. He played one game in Major League Baseball, August 11 as a center fielder for the 1882 Pittsburgh Alleghenys. He was hitless in three at bats. He had played college baseball at Geneva College.

References

External links

1861 births
1951 deaths
People from Elizabeth, Pennsylvania
Baseball players from Pennsylvania 
Major League Baseball center fielders
Pittsburgh Alleghenys players
19th-century baseball players
Burials at Homewood Cemetery